Písek District is a district in the South Bohemian Region of the Czech Republic. Its capital is the town of Písek.

Administrative division
Písek District is divided into two administrative districts of municipalities with extended competence: Písek and Milevsko.

List of municipalities
Towns are marked in bold and market towns in italics:

Albrechtice nad Vltavou –
Bernartice –
Borovany –
Boudy –
Božetice –
Branice –
Cerhonice –
Chyšky –
Čimelice –
Čížová –
Dobev –
Dolní Novosedly –
Dražíč –
Drhovle –
Heřmaň –
Horosedly –
Hrazany –
Hrejkovice –
Jetětice –
Jickovice –
Kestřany –
Kluky –
Kostelec nad Vltavou –
Kovářov –
Kožlí –
Králova Lhota –
Křenovice –
Křižanov –
Kučeř –
Květov –
Lety –
Milevsko –
Minice –
Mirotice –
Mirovice –
Mišovice –
Myslín –
Nerestce –
Nevězice –
Okrouhlá –
Olešná –
Orlík nad Vltavou –
Osek –
Oslov –
Ostrovec –
Paseky –
Písek –
Podolí I –
Přeborov –
Předotice –
Přeštěnice –
Probulov –
Protivín –
Putim –
Rakovice –
Ražice –
Sepekov –
Skály –
Slabčice –
Smetanova Lhota –
Stehlovice –
Tálín –
Temešvár –
Varvažov –
Veselíčko –
Vlastec –
Vlksice –
Vojníkov –
Vráž –
Vrcovice –
Záhoří –
Zbelítov –
Zběšičky –
Žďár –
Zhoř –
Zvíkovské Podhradí

Geography

Most of the territory is characterized by an undulating landscape with many low hills. The territory extends into four geomorphological mesoregions: Tábor Uplands (most of the territory), Vlašim Uplands (northeast), Benešov Uplands (northwest) and České Budějovice Basin (south).

The territory is rich in watercourses and ponds. The most important river is the Vltava, which flows across the territory from southeast to north, and, together with its tributaries, drains the whole district. The most significant tributary is the Otava, which connects with the Vlatva in the centre of the territory. On the Vltava is built the Orlík Reservoir, which is the second largest reservoir in the country. There are many ponds, especially in the České Budějovice Basin area.

There are no large-scale protected areas.

Demographics

Most populated municipalities

Economy
The largest employers with its headquarters in Písek District and at least 500 employers are:

Transport
The D4 motorway from Prague to Písek, including its unfinished section, leads into the district. It further continues as the I/20 road, which is part of the European route E49.

Sights

The most important monuments in the district, protected as national cultural monuments, are:
Zvíkov Castle
Písek Stone Bridge
Orlík Castle
Milevsko Monastery
Písek National Stud Farm

The best-preserved settlements and landscapes, protected as monument zones, are:

Písek
Mirovice
Budičovice
Krašovice
Květov
Putim
Smrkovice
Tukleky
Varvažov
Zahrádka
Žebrákov
Čimelicko-Rakovicko landscape
Orlicko landscape

The most visited tourist destination is the Zvíkov Castle.

References

External links

Písek District profile on the Czech Statistical Office's website

 
Districts of the Czech Republic